Sawyer Mountain is a mountain located in Adirondack Mountains of New York located in the Town of Indian Lake west-northwest of Indian Lake.

The Sawyer Mountain Trail is a 2.1 mile, moderate rated, trail located near Blue Mountain Lake. The trailhead located on Rte 28/30 between the hamlets of Indian Lake and Blue Mountain Lake in the Adirondacks. The trail does not summit the true top, which is 0.2 miles further south of the viewing platform.

References

Mountains of Hamilton County, New York
Mountains of New York (state)